Worgret  is a hamlet in the English county of Dorset. It is situated immediately to the west of the town of Wareham.

Worgret forms part of the civil parish of Arne, within the Purbeck local government district.

Name
Worgret shares its name with a 7th-century Abbot of Glastonbury reported by William of Malmesbury.

References

External links

Hamlets in Dorset